Lesbian, gay, bisexual, and transgender (LGBT) persons in Chad face legal challenges not experienced by non-LGBT residents. Both male and female same-sex sexual activity is illegal in the country. Before the new penal code took effect in August 2017, homosexual activity between adults had never been criminalised.
There is no legal protection against discrimination based on sexual orientation and gender identity.

Law regarding same-sex sexual activity 
Same-sex sexual activity is illegal in Chad since 2017. Previous to that there were no restrictions. A bill introduced in 2014 aimed to impose up to 20 years imprisonment for consensual same-sex acts (proposed Article 361bis). However, on 12 December 2016, the National Assembly passed an updated penal code criminalising both male and female same-sex sexual activity by a vote of 111 to 1 (with 4 abstentions), but classing acts between consenting adults as a misdemeanour offence. On 8 May 2017, the new penal code was enacted by the President Idriss Deby.

In supporting the law, the former Prime Minister Delwa Kassiré Coumakoye argued a religious motivation: "Homosexuality is condemned by all religions. We do not have to forgive something that God himself rejects because Westerners have said this or that." His comment was criticized by some LGBT historians who controversially maintain that homophobia was brought to Chad by colonialism, despite the existence of Islamic law in the nation prior to imperial rule. These historians believe that homosexuality was quite commonplace and accepted before the arrival of the Europeans. The US-based Robert F. Kennedy Human Rights called on the President of Chad not to enact the changes to the law, which is linked to a rise in homophobia in Africa in response to the increased visibility and assertiveness of gay lifestyles and politics in Africa, and the engagement of fundamentalist Christians. This includes the financing of anti-gay campaigns by American evangelical churches.

It became law on 1 August 2017.

Chapter II on "Other offenses against decency" of Title VII (relating to sexual offences) of the Penal Code, provides as follows:
Article 354. Everyone who has sex with persons of the same sex is liable to imprisonment for three months to two years and a fine of between 50,000 and 500,000 francs.

Chapter III on "Offenses of a sexual nature committed against minors" of Title VIII (relating to offenses against the person or the status of the child) of the Penal Code, provides as follows:
Article 360. Anyone who, without violence, maintains a sexual relationship or practices sexual touching on a person of the same sex aged less than eighteen (18) years will be punished with imprisonment of one (1) to three (3) years and a fine of 100,000 to 500,000 francs.

Sexual orientation 
Article 350(i) of the Penal Code provides imprisonment of ten to twenty years when the rape is committed because of the sexual orientation of the victim.

Recognition of same sex relationships 
There is no legal recognition of same-sex couples.

Living conditions 

The U.S. Department of State's 2010 Human Rights Report found that "there were no known lesbian, gay, bisexual, and transgender (LGBT) organizations. There were few reports of violence or discrimination against LGBT persons, in large part because most such persons were discreet about sexual orientation due to social and cultural strictures against homosexuality."

Summary table

See also 

Human rights in Chad
LGBT rights in Africa
LGBT rights by country or territory

Notes

References

External links 
UK government travel advice for Chad: Local laws and customs

Law of Chad
Chad
LGBT in Chad
Human rights in Chad
Politics of Chad